Elana Maryles Sztokman (born December 20, 1969) is an American sociologist, writer, and Jewish feminist activist. Her first two books, which explore the topic of gender identity in the Orthodox Jewish community, were awarded the National Jewish Book Award. She ran unsuccessfully for the Knesset in the 2020 Israeli legislative election as a founding member of the Kol Hanashim Women's Party.

Biography
Sztokman was born in Flatbush, Brooklyn, the third of four daughters born to Gladys (née Schmeltz) and Matthew Maryles, an investment banker. Sztokman attended the Yeshiva of Flatbush elementary and high schools, going on to study political science and education at Barnard College. She immigrated to Israel in 1993, and received a master's degree in Jewish education and a doctorate in education, sociology, and anthropology from the Hebrew University of Jerusalem.

She helped found Mavoi Satum, an organization dedicated to helping agunot, which she co-chaired from 1997 to 2002, and became the executive director of the Jewish Orthodox Feminist Alliance in 2012. She received media attention in September 2014, after a Haredi man refused to sit next to her on an El Al flight from the U.S. to Israel.

As of 2017, Sztokman was studying to become a Reform rabbi at the Hebrew Union College-Jewish Institute of Religion.

Bibliography
 The Men's Section: Orthodox Jewish Men in an Egalitarian World (University Press of New England, 2011)
 Educating in the Divine Image: Gender Issues in Orthodox Jewish Day Schools (with Chaya Rosenfeld Gorsetman) (Brandeis University Press, 2013)
 The War on Women in Israel: How Religious Radicalism is Stifling the Voice of a Nation (Sourcebooks, September 2014)
 Masala Mamas: Recipes and Stories from Indian Women Changing their Communities through Food and Love (Lioness, an imprint of Panoma Press, 2018)
 Conversations with My Body: Essays on My Life as a Jewish Woman (Lioness, 2021)

References

External links
 

1969 births
Living people
Writers from Brooklyn
Jewish American writers
American sociologists
American women sociologists
Barnard College alumni
Orthodox Jewish feminists
Educators from New York (state)
American women educators
Jewish sociologists
American women anthropologists
21st-century American Jews
21st-century American women